Kamalabad (also Romanized as Kamālābād) is a village in Mashiz Rural District, in the Central District of Bardsir County, Kerman Province, Iran. At the 2006 census, its population was 466, in 115 families.

References 

Populated places in Bardsir County